Anthony is a rural locality in the Scenic Rim Region, Queensland, Australia.

Geography 
The Roadvale Harrisville Road traverses the locality from south-east (Roadvale) to the north-east (Milora/Milbong).

The creeks that rise in the locality contribute to the Bremer River, a tributary of the Brisbane River which flows into Moreton Bay.

The principal land use is grazing with some cropping.

History 
The locality takes its name from the Anthony railway station, which in turn was named circa 1887 after a local resident.

The Fassifern railway line (Queensland's first branch railway line) opened from Ipswich to Harrisville on 10 July 1882. On 12 September 1887 the line was extended to Dugundan with the Anthony district being served by Anthony railway station . The line closed in June 1964.

The locality contains 40 households, in which 45.4% of the population are males and 54.6% of the population are females with a median age of 43, 5 above the national average. The average weekly household income is $1,531, $93 above the national average.

Education 
There are no schools in Anthony. The nearest primary schools are in Roadvale and Harrisville. The nearest secondary school is in Boonah.

References 

Scenic Rim Region
Localities in Queensland